The Henry Wadsworth Longfellow Monument is a public monument in Portland, Maine's West End. Located on the corner of State and Congress Street, it honors poet Henry Wadsworth Longfellow, who was born in Portland in 1807.  The intersection built around the monument is known as Longfellow Square.

Description
The Henry Wadsworth Longellow Monument occupies a triangular plaza formed at the southeast corner of Congress and State Streets in central Portland. The southeast side of the plaza is occupied by One Longfellow Square. The monument consists of a bronze statue of Longfellow, as seen late in his life, in a seated position, which is mounted on a granite pedestal. Above these is a frieze band of anthemion and vines, with a cornice above that. Longfellow wears an overcoat, and a cape is draped over his lap and one shoulder. One hand holds a manuscript, while the other is propped on the chair back, while Longfellow gazes at passersby.

History
Franklin Simmons began the design and construction of the monument in 1885, three years after the poet's death, with a pedestal designed by Francis H. Fassett. The monument was unveiled on September 29, 1888.  The monument is considered to be one of Simmons' major commissions. The monument was added to the National Register of Historic Places in April 1990.

Gallery

See also
National Register of Historic Places listings in Portland, Maine
Henry Wadsworth Longfellow Memorial in Washington, D. C.

References

External links
 Henry Wadsworth Longfellow Monument MaineMemory.net

Henry Wadsworth Longfellow
Cultural infrastructure completed in 1888
Monuments and memorials in Portland, Maine
Monuments and memorials on the National Register of Historic Places in Maine
West End (Portland, Maine)
National Register of Historic Places in Portland, Maine
Longfellow
Public art in Portland, Maine